Giulio Campi (1502 – 5 March 1572) was an Italian painter and architect. His brothers Vincenzo Campi and Antonio Campi were also renowned painters.

Biography
The eldest of a family prominent painters, Campi was born at Cremona. His father Galeazzo (1475–1536) taught him the first lessons in art.

In 1522, in Mantua, he studied painting, architecture, and modelling under  Giulio Romano. He visited Rome, became an ardent student of the antique, and like Bernardino — distantly related to him — he combined a Lombard and Roman traditions. He collaborated on some works with Camillo Boccaccino, the son of Boccaccio Boccaccino, with whom Campi may also have received training.

Campi is called the "Ludovico Carracci of Cremona" for his influence, since Campi was as influential during the Renaissance in Cremona as the latter was on the Baroque school of Bologna. When he was just twenty-seven Giulio executed for the church of Sant'Abondio his masterpiece, a Virgin and Child with Sts Celsus and Nazarus, a decoration masterly in the freedom of its drawing and in the splendour of its color. His numerous paintings are grandly and reverently conceived, freely drawn, vigorously coloured, lofty in style, and broadly handled. He was animated in all his work by a deep piety. Many of his fresco works are housed in churches of Cremona, Mantua, Milan and in the church of Saint Margaret's, in his native town. Among his chief works are The Chess Game, Descent from the Cross in San Sigismondo at Cremona, and the frescoes in the dome of San Girolamo at Mantua. He was involved in the reconstruction and decoration of the church of Santa Rita in Cremona. An altar-piece in San Sigismondo and his Labours of Hercules were engraved by the celebrated Ghiso, il Mantovano.

He died in Cremona in 1572.

Notes

References

External links

The engravings of Giorgio Ghisi, an exhibition catalog from The Metropolitan Museum of Art (fully available online as PDF), which contains material on Campi (see index)
Painters of reality: the legacy of Leonardo and Caravaggio in Lombardy, an exhibition catalog from The Metropolitan Museum of Art (fully available online as PDF), which contains material on Campi (see index)

1502 births
1572 deaths
Architects from Cremona
16th-century Italian architects
Italian Renaissance architects
16th-century Italian painters
Italian male painters
Painters from Cremona
Renaissance painters